Woody De Othello (born 1991) is an American ceramicist and painter. He lives and works in the San Francisco Bay Area, California.

Early life and education 
Woody De Othello was born in 1991 in Miami, Florida. He is of Haitian descent.

Othello received a BFA degree from Florida Atlantic University in Boca Raton, and an MFA degree from the California College of Arts in San Francisco in 2017.

Career 
In 2015, Othello's debut solo exhibition, It's Going To Be Ok, was held at Unit 1 gallery in Lake Worth, Florida. In 2018, Othello was included in Yerba Buena Center for the Arts triennial exhibition, "Bay Area Now 8." In 2019 the San Jose Museum of Art hosted, Woody De Othello: Breathing Room. Looking In, a solo exhibition of Othello's work at Jessica Silverman Gallery in 2021 included ceramic sculptures, paintings, and framed works on paper.

His eight-foot tall, bronze sculpture of a yellow box fan, entitled Cool Composition, received critical attention at 2019's Art Basel in Miami Beach.

In 2022 Othello was selected to participate in the 2022 Whitney Biennial, curated by Adrienne Edwards and David Breslin. His biennial installation, The will to make things happen, included a set of exaggerated, domestic objects such as a radiator, accompanied by anthropomorphized ceramic vessels with hands and legs.

Othello has referred to an interest in pottery by South Carolinian enslaved potters such as David Drake, as well as precolonial Yoruba pottery, as inspiration for his work.

Exhibitions 

 UFO Gallery, Berkeley, California (2016)
 Quality, Oakland, California (2016)
 Jessica Silverman Gallery, San Francisco (2018)
 Karma, New York (2019)
 33rd Ljublijana Biennial of Graphic Arts in Ljublijana, Slovenia (2019).
 San Jose Museum of Art, California (2019- 2020)
 Pippy Houldsworth Gallery, London (2020)
 Nina Johnson, Miami (2020)
 Jessica Silverman Gallery, San Francisco (2021)
 2022 Whitney Biennial (2022)

Collections 
Othello's work is in the collection of a number of contemporary art museums including: Institute of Contemporary Art, Miami; San Francisco Museum of Modern Art; San Jose Museum of Art, San Jose, California; and the Renwick Gallery, Smithsonian American Art Museum, Washington D.C.

References 

American ceramists
American potters
Artists from Miami
21st-century ceramists
21st-century African-American people
African-American artists
African-American ceramists
California College of the Arts alumni
Florida Atlantic University alumni
1991 births
Living people